Warren Weston Miller (born January 28, 1983) is an American basketball coach and former player, who is the head men's basketball coach at the University of Cincinnati. Born in Greensboro, North Carolina, he played at the collegiate level for James Madison University and the University of North Carolina–Chapel Hill, where he graduated in 2007. Professionally, Miller played for London Capital of the British Basketball League. Prior to that, he was head coach at UNC Greensboro, and served stints as an assistant coach at Elon University and High Point University.

Playing career
Miller attended New Hampton Prep in New Hampton, New Hampshire. Miller played one year at James Madison before transferring to North Carolina to play for Roy Williams, where he successfully walked on to the basketball team. He was redshirted for the 2003–2004 season. Miller played on the Tar Heel team that won the 2005 National Championship. He graduated in 2007 with a bachelor's degree in political science and after graduation he wrote a book titled The Road to Blue Heaven about his road to the University of North Carolina and his years playing there. After graduation, Miller played one season for the London Capitals of the British Basketball League.

Coaching career

Early career
After playing professionally in England for a year, Miller was hired as an assistant coach at Elon University to join the staff of head coach Ernie Nestor. Elon had a record of 12–19 in the 2008–2009 season and Nestor stepped down as head coach at the end of the year. Miller was hired at High Point University and joined the staff of their new head coach, Scott Cherry, the next season.

UNC Greensboro
For the 2010-11 basketball season, Miller became an assistant coach at the University of North Carolina at Greensboro under Mike Dement. That team finished the season 7-24, in fifth place in the Southern Conference.

The next year Dement retired mid-season and Miller became interim head coach. At the time, the Spartans had a record of 2-8 and were in the midst of an eleven-game losing streak. Under Miller, the team finished Southern Conference play with a 10–8 record, 13-19 overall, winning first place in the Southern Conference North Division. Miller was named the 2012 Southern Conference Coach of the Year and was hired officially as head coach.

Miller spent the following ten seasons as the UNCG men's basketball coach. During his tenure UNCG saw an unprecedented run of success, reaching 25 wins for three successive seasons between 2016 and 2019, winning three Southern Conference championships, reaching the NCAA tournament in 2018 and 2021, and recording the program's first postseason victory in 2019. Miller is the winningest coach in UNC Greensboro history, with 185 victories.

Cincinnati
On April 14, 2021 Cincinnati hired Miller to become their next head coach, replacing John Brannen. He finished his first season leading the Bearcats to a 18-15 record, while going 7-11 in conference play. They placed 8th in the American Athletic Conference.

Personal
Miller's father, Kenneth D. Miller, is a prominent alumnus and trustee of Wake Forest University. Wes's younger brother Walker Miller also played basketball for North Carolina before transferring to Monmouth for his final year of eligibility.

College statistics

|-
| align="left" | 2002–03
| align="left" | James Madison
| 30 || 0 || 17.2 || .350 || .320 || .600 || 1.0 || 1.3 || 0.5 || 0.0 || 4.1
|-
| align="left" | 2003–04
| align="left" | North Carolina
| colspan="11" style="text-align:center;"|  Redshirt
|-
| align="left" | 2004–05
| align="left" | North Carolina
| 24 || 0 || 3.8 || .300 || .313 || .692 || 0.2 || 0.5 || 0.0 || 0.0 || 1.1
|-
| align="left" | 2005–06
| align="left" | North Carolina
| 31 || 16 || 22.9 || .438 || .441 || .720 || 1.4 || 1.9 || 1.1 || 0.0 || 7.2
|-
| align="left" | 2006–07
| align="left" | North Carolina
| 38 || 1 || 10.6 || .322 || .333 || .733 || 0.5 || 1.1 || 0.3 || 0.0 || 2.5
|-
| align="left" | Career
| align="left" | 
| 123 || 17 || 14.0 || .377 || .373 || .698 || 0.8 || 1.3 || 0.5 || 0.0 || 3.8

Source

Head coaching record

References

External links
 Wes Miller – GoBearcats.com

1983 births
Living people
American expatriate basketball people in the United Kingdom
American men's basketball coaches
American men's basketball players
Basketball coaches from North Carolina
Basketball players from Charlotte, North Carolina
British Basketball League players
Cincinnati Bearcats men's basketball coaches
College men's basketball head coaches in the United States
High Point Panthers men's basketball coaches
James Madison Dukes men's basketball players
North Carolina Tar Heels men's basketball players
Point guards
Sportspeople from Charlotte, North Carolina
UNC Greensboro Spartans men's basketball coaches